These are the rosters of all participating teams at the men's water polo tournament at the 2017 World Aquatics Championships in Budapest, Hungary.

Group A

The following is the Montenegrin roster in the men's water polo tournament of the 2017 World Aquatics Championships.

Head coach: Vladimir Gojković

The following is the Brazilian roster in the men's water polo tournament of the 2017 World Aquatics Championships.

Head coach: Ângelo Coelho

The following is the Canadian roster in the men's water polo tournament of the 2017 World Aquatics Championships.

Head coach:  Giuseppe Porzio

The following is the Kazakhstan roster in the men's water polo tournament of the 2017 World Aquatics Championships.

Head coach:  Nemanja Knežević

Group B

The following is the Italian roster in the men's water polo tournament of the 2017 World Aquatics Championships.

Head coach: Alessandro Campagna

The following is the Hungarian roster in the men's water polo tournament of the 2017 World Aquatics Championships.

Head coach: Tamás Märcz

The following is the Australian roster in the men's water polo tournament of the 2017 World Aquatics Championships.

Head coach:  Elvis Fatović

The following is the French roster in the men's water polo tournament of the 2017 World Aquatics Championships.

Head coach:  Hrestak Hrvoje

Group C

The following is the Serbian roster in the men's water polo tournament of the 2017 World Aquatics Championships.

Head coach: Dejan Savić

The following is the Greek roster in the men's water polo tournament of the 2017 World Aquatics Championships.

Head coach: Thodoris Vlachos

The following is the Spanish roster in the men's water polo tournament of the 2017 World Aquatics Championships.

Head coach: David Martín

The following is the South African roster in the men's water polo tournament of the 2017 World Aquatics Championships.

Head coach: Paul Martin

Group D

The following is the Croatian roster in the men's water polo tournament of the 2017 World Aquatics Championships.

Head coach: Ivica Tucak

The following is the American roster in the men's water polo tournament of the 2017 World Aquatics Championships.

Head coach:  Dejan Udovičić

The following is the Russian roster in the men's water polo tournament of the 2017 World Aquatics Championships.

Head coach: Sergey Evstigneev

The following is the Japanese roster in the men's water polo tournament of the 2017 World Aquatics Championships.

Head coach: Yoji Omoto

References

External links
Official website
Records and statistics (reports by Omega)

World Aquatics Championships water polo squads
Men's team rosters